The Ticino Musica Festival is an international classical music festival that takes place every year from the 18th to the 31st July in Ticino, in the southern Switzerland. It includes masterclasses, the International Opera Studio "Silvio Varviso", concerts and other events.

History 
The Festival was founded in 1979 by Janos Meszaros, starting in Assisi and then in Riva del Garda until it moved to the present place in 1997, where it fully developed to reach its actual state.

The aim of the festival is to offer the possibility to young musicians to develop themselves, meeting and playing with colleagues and teachers from all over the world. It also promotes the tourismus and the cultural life of the region by offering during the two weeks musical public events

It presents every year new rising stars from the musical world, including in its agenda concerts performed by winners of the ARD International Music Competition and the Prague Spring International Music Competition.

Academy

International Opera Studio "Silvio Varviso" 
Ticino Musica Festival is including since 2004 the international opera studio dedicated to the Austrian conductor Silvio Varviso, where young singers have the possibility to study and perform selected lyric operas, challenging their abilities and their talent, under the guidance of expert teachers.

During the years directors, screenwriters and conductor from all over the world participated, such as Umberto Finazzi, Paul Suter, Martin Markun, Erich Holliger, Laura Cosso, Marco Gandini, Claudio Cinelli, Stefanie C. Braun e Daniele Piscopo.

References

External links 
Official website

Youtube Channel

Music festivals in Switzerland